The narrowhead catshark (Bythaelurus tenuicephalus) is a catshark of the family Scyliorhinidae. This species is described based on one adult and one juvenile male specimen from off Tanzania and Mozambique in the western Indian Ocean. The species differs from its congeners by its slender head and snout, which is only slightly bell-shaped in dorsoventral view without distinct lateral indention. It further differs from B. clevai by attaining a smaller maximum size and having a color pattern of fewer and smaller blotches, larger oral papillae, a shorter snout, and broader claspers without knob-like apex and with a smaller envelope and a subtriangular exorhipidion. Compared to B. hispidus, the species has a longer snout, a longer dorsal-caudal space, broader clasper without knob-like apex, and fewer vertebral centra. In contrast to B. lutarius, B. tenuicephalus attains a smaller size and has a blotched coloration, numerous oral papillae, shorter anterior nasal flaps, a longer caudal fin, a shorter pelvic anal space, and shorter and broader claspers.

References

narrow-head catshark
Fish of Mozambique
Fish of Tanzania
narrowhead catshark